The Ganga Canal  of Rajasthan (also called Gang Canal) is an irrigation system of canals laid down by Maharaja Ganga Singh of Bikaner in his princely state in the present district of Sri Ganganagar in the early twentieth century. It is fed from the Sutlej River near Firozpur, Punjab, close to the India–Pakistan border, and passes through the Faridkot and Muktsar districts. Faridkot's Jhok Sarkari village lies on its path.

History

The Bikaner state was one of the areas most affected by the Indian famine of 1899–1900. In order to get rid of this problem permanently, in 1903 Maharaja Ganga Singh obtained the services of A. W. E. Standley, chief engineer, who demonstrated the feasibility of the western area of the Bikaner State being brought under irrigation from the Satluj Waters. The plan of the Satluj Valley Project was drawn by then chief engineer of Punjab Mr. R. G. Kennedy, according to which the vast area of erstwhile Bikaner state could be brought under irrigation. Because of objections by the erstwhile Muslim State of Bahawalpur, the project got delayed and finally with intervention of then viceroy of India, Lord Curzon, in 1906, a tripartite conference was held and an agreement was signed on 4 September 1920. The foundation stone of the Canal Head Works at Ferozepur was laid on 5 December 1925 and the work completed in 1927 by constructing 89 miles of lined canal. The opening ceremony was performed on 26 October 1927 by Lord Irwin, the then viceroy of India. Irrigated parts of then Bikaner State now came under the Sri Ganganagar district and Hanumangarh district. The canal irrigates 303,000 hectares of land, roughly equivalent to that of the Upper Bari Doab Canal.

The cost of whole project was Rupees 310.97 Lakhs upto 1943. Another 60 Lakhs were spent on development of Gang Colony and railways.
After construction of the canal, many people from south Punjab migrated to this area, the state administration facilitated several facilities for them. With availability of water from canal, this area transformed into rich land and Ganganagar became the granary of Rajasthan. 

During the Partition of India, Sir Cyril Radcliffe, the chairman of the Punjab Boundary Commission, initially considered awarding the Ferozpur and Zira tehsils of the Ferozpur District to Pakistan. This would have put the headwaters of the Ganga Canal in the territory of Pakistan. Bikaner's prime minister K. M. Panikkar warned the Viceroy Lord Mountbatten that the Bikaner state would have no choice but to accede to Pakistan in the event of the headwaters going to Pakistan. Jawaharlal Nehru also wrote to the Viceroy stating that it would be "most dangerous" for the Ferozpur district to go to Pakistan for "strategic and irrigation reasons". Subsequently, Radcliffe removed the salient and awarded the entire Ferozpur district to India.

See also
 Indira Gandhi Canal
 Radcliffe Line

References

Bibliography

External links
 Gang Canal marked on OpenStreetMap: 1, 2, 3, 4

Sri Ganganagar district
Canals in Rajasthan
Irrigation canals
Canals opened in 1927